Women's floor competition at the 2008 Summer Olympics was held on August 17 at the Beijing National Indoor Stadium.

The eight competitors (with a maximum of two per nation) with the highest scores in the qualifying round proceed to the women's floor finals. There, each gymnast performs again; the scores from the final round (ignoring qualification) determine final ranking.

Final

Qualified competitors

References
 Floor Final Results 
 Floor Qualification Results

Gymnastics at the 2008 Summer Olympics
2008
2008 in women's gymnastics
Women's events at the 2008 Summer Olympics